Sybrohyagnis is a genus of beetles in the family Cerambycidae, containing the following species:

 Sybrohyagnis congoensis Breuning, 1964
 Sybrohyagnis fuscomaculata Breuning, 1960
 Sybrohyagnis minor Breuning, 1964

References

Apomecynini